The Ministry of Justice and Border Control of Nauru upholds the Constitution, provides legal advice to the federal government and represents the interests of the country in civil and criminal matters. It is divided into six sections:

 Secretariat
 Prosecution
 Regional Processing Centre Administration
 Immigration and Passport
 Quarantine
 Correctional Services
 Refugee Status Determination

List of ministers (1972-present) 

Joseph Detsimea Audoa (1968–1976)
Bernard Dowiyogo (1976–1977)
Buraro Detudamo (1978)
Kenas Aroi (1978–1980)
Joseph Detsimea Audoa (1980–1983)
Bernard Dowiyogo (1984-1989)
 Kennan Adeang (1990-1991)
 Pres Nîmes Ekwona (1992)
 Ludwig Scotty (1993)
 Derog Gloura (1993-1995
 Anthony Audoa (1996-1997)
 Vassal Gadoengin (1997-2001)
 Godfrey Thoma (2001-2008)
 Matthew Batsiua (2008-2012)
 Dominic Tabuna (2012-2013)
 Roland Kun (2013)
 David Adeang (2013–2022)
 Russ Kun (since 2022)

See also 

 Justice ministry
 Politics of Nauru

References 

Justice ministries
Government of Nauru